The men's pommel horse competition was one of eight events for male competitors in artistic gymnastics at the 1988 Summer Olympics in Seoul. The qualification and final rounds took place on September 18, 20 and 24th at the Olympic Gymnastics Hall. There were 89 competitors from 23 nations, with nations competing in the team event having 6 gymnasts and other nations having up to 3 gymnasts. For the second time (the first was in 1948), the event ended in a three-way tie for first place. Dmitry Bilozerchev of the Soviet Union, Zsolt Borkai of Hungary, and Lubomir Geraskov of Bulgaria each received a gold medal. It was Bulgaria's first medal in the pommel horse. Hungary had its third gold medal in four Games, with Zoltán Magyar winning in 1976 and 1980 before the nation joined the Soviet-led boycott in 1984. The Soviets had had an eight-Games medal streak in the event snapped by that boycott; Bilozerchev's medal put the nation back on the podium after that one-Games absence.

Background

This was the 17th appearance of the event, which is one of the five apparatus events held every time there were apparatus events at the Summer Olympics (no apparatus events were held in 1900, 1908, 1912, or 1920). Two of the eight finalists from 1984 returned: gold medalist Li Ning of China and eighth-place finisher Josef Zellweger of Switzerland. There were two reigning world champions, as Soviet Dmitry Bilozerchev and Hungarian Zsolt Borkai had tied. Bulgarian Lubomir Geraskov was the bronze medalist at the world championships.

Chinese Taipei made its debut in the men's pommel horse. The United States made its 15th appearance, most of any nation; the Americans had missed only the inaugural 1896 pommel horse and the boycotted 1980 Games.

Competition format

Each nation entered a team of six gymnasts or up to three individual gymnasts. All entrants in the gymnastics competitions performed both a compulsory exercise and a voluntary exercise for each apparatus. The scores for all 12 exercises were summed to give an individual all-around score. These exercise scores were also used for qualification for the apparatus finals. The two exercises (compulsory and voluntary) for each apparatus were summed to give an apparatus score. Half of the preliminary score carried over to the final. The 1984 Games had expanded the number of finalists from six to eight. Nations were still limited to two finalists each. Others were ranked 9th through 89th.

Schedule

All times are Korea Standard Time adjusted for daylight savings (UTC+10)

Results

Eighty-nine gymnasts competed in the pommel horse event during the compulsory and optional rounds on September 18 and 20. The eight highest scoring gymnasts advanced to the final on September 24. Each country was limited to two competitors in the final. Half of the points earned by each gymnast during both the compulsory and optional rounds carried over to the final. This constitutes the "prelim" score.

References

Official Olympic Report
www.gymnasticsresults.com

Men's pommel horse
Men's 1988
Men's events at the 1988 Summer Olympics